Mr. Romeo is a 1996 Indian Tamil-language action comedy film directed by K. S. Ravi and produced by R. B. Choudary. The film stars Prabhu Deva in a dual roles with Shilpa Shetty and Madhoo playing the female leading roles, with Surendra Pal, Vadivelu and Vijayakumar playing supporting roles. A. R. Rahman scored music for the film (in his 25th film composition). The film was released on 10 November 1996.

Plot 
In Bangalore, Romeo lives a privileged life as a celebrity with his widowed mother. He receives considerable assistance and encouragement from Sathyamoorthy to dance and sing. He meets and is attracted to Madhoo, who is also his fan. His mother meets with Madhoo's grandfather and both arrange their wedding. Then Romeo finds out that Sathyamoorthy has been stealing body organ from patients in the Sathyamoorthy Hospital, and then stages their deaths via bus accidents. He meets with Sathyamoorthy and warns him that he is going to expose him publicly. Before he could reveal their activities Romeo is shot and thrown off of a cliff. His friend Prakash is framed for his murder and is sentenced to life imprisonment. In Dharavi, Prakash's sister Shilpa comes across Madras a poor funeral dancer who is a lookalike of Romeo and convinces him to impersonate Romeo to clear her brother's name as well as to find the real perpetrator of the crime.

After getting thrown off the cliff, Romeo is taken in by tribals living in the hills and manages to survive. Upon finding Madras impersonating him, Romeo realises that Madras is his twin brother long presumed dead, using this to his advantage he starts taking revenge on Sathyamoorthy. Meanwhile, Madras and Shilpa fall in love with each other. Sathyamoorthy Madras and Romeo eventually expose Sathyamoorthy's illegal activities to the public and Sathyamoorthy is sent to jail.

Cast 

 Prabhu Deva as Madras and Romeo
 Shilpa Shetty as Shilpa
 Madhoo as Madhoo
 Vadivelu as Vavval
 Vijayakumar as DGP Vijayakumar
 Surendra Pal as Sathyamoorthy
 Vennira Aadai Moorthy as Madhoo's grandfather
 Delhi Ganesh as Madras and Romeo's father
 Madhan Bob as Sabapathy
 Mohan Ram as Judge
 Kavitha as Madras and Romeo's mother
 Jyothi Meena as Indigenous woman
 Ajay Rathnam as Ajay
 Uday Prakash as Prakash
 Krishnamoorthy as Singaram
 A. K. Veerasami as Vettiyan
 Chitraguptan as Kathirikka
 Radhabhai as Midwife
 K. S. Jayalakshmi as Idli seller
 Crazy Mohan as Shop manager

Production 
Prabhu Deva signed the film after securing a blockbuster with Shankar's Kaadhalan (1994) and demanded  for his work in the film. North Indian actress Shilpa Shetty was roped in to star in her first Tamil film, while Madhoo, who appeared in Mani Ratnam's Roja and Shankar's Gentleman was signed on to play second lead. The producer of the film asked the director, K. S. Ravi to be credited simply as Ravi in the film, to avoid confusion with another director K. S. Ravikumar. Mitchell camera weighed 50 kg was used for all the "double action" shots.

Release 
The film opened in November 1996 and failed to meet the expectations at the box office, becoming Prabhu Deva's second consecutive average after Love Birds.

A.R. Rahman played a role in recommending the director K. S. Ravi to work in En Swasa Katre, a production of Rahman's acquaintances. Mr. Romeo was also belatedly dubbed and released in Hindi under the same title.

Soundtrack 

The music is scored by A. R. Rahman for the lyrics penned by  Vaali and the soundtrack was distributed by Pyramid AV International. The lyrics for the Hindi version was penned by P. K. Mishra. The soundtrack won positive reviews and became chartbusters.
 Original Version

 Hindi Version (Mr. Romeo)

References

External links 
 

1990s Tamil-language films
1996 action comedy films
1996 films
Films directed by K. S. Ravi
Films scored by A. R. Rahman
Films set in Chennai
Films with screenplays by Crazy Mohan
Indian action comedy films
Super Good Films films
Twins in Indian films